Kuzminovka is a rural locality (a village) in Mrakovsky Selsoviet, Kugarchinsky District, Bashkortostan, Russia. The population was 83 as of 2010. There are 4 streets.

Geography 
Kuzminovka is located 6 km southeast of Mrakovo (the district's administrative centre) by road. Kurt-Yelga is the nearest rural locality.

References 

Rural localities in Kugarchinsky District